Dr Vera Frances Deacon  (19 July 1926 – 16 May 2021) was an Australian historian, writer and philanthropist.

Biography 
Deacon was born in the Newcastle suburb of Mayfield and raised on Dempsey and Mosquito Island (also known as Moscheto), on the Hunter River.

In 2019 the book Singing Back The River was published, which includes her stories and recollections of life on the Hunter River.

She first started donating to the University of Newcastle’s archives in 2001 to support regional history through the acquisition, conservation and research of significant regional historical resources.

Recognition 
The Vera Deacon Regional History Fund was established in her honour in 2008. She was named Freeman of the City of Newcastle, New South Wales, Australia in 2019.

In 2020 Deacon was awarded the Medal of the Order of Australia for service to community history and to conservation. In this same year she was awarded an honorary doctorate, Doctor of Letters, from the University of Newcastle.

References 

1926 births
2021 deaths
Australian historians
Australian women historians
Recipients of the Medal of the Order of Australia
21st-century Australian historians
People from the Hunter Region